"L'Envers de la Terre" is the first single from French singer Leslie's third album, L'amour en vol.

Track listing
"L'Envers de la Terre"
"Tell Me" [supa Station]

Charts

References

2006 songs
Leslie (singer) songs